Andrey Tsevan (born 15 March 1986) is a Belarusian former footballer.

Honours
Dinamo Brest
Belarusian Cup winner: 2006–07

Shakhtyor Soligorsk
Belarusian Cup winner: 2013–14

References

External links
 
 
 Player profile on official site

1986 births
Living people
Belarusian footballers
Association football midfielders
FC Dynamo Brest players
FC Shakhtyor Soligorsk players
FC Rukh Brest players
People from Baranavichy
Sportspeople from Brest Region